Rod Vernon (3 April 1934 – 8 July 2016) was an  Australian rules footballer who played with Fitzroy in the Victorian Football League (VFL).

Notes

External links 		
		

		
		
2016 deaths		
1934 births		
Australian rules footballers from Victoria (Australia)		
Fitzroy Football Club players